Podągi  is a village in the administrative district of Gmina Godkowo, within Elbląg County, Warmian-Masurian Voivodeship, in northern Poland.

Notable residents
 August von Kanitz (1783-1852), Prussian General
 Hans von Kanitz (1841–1913), Politician
 Gerhard von Kanitz (1885–1949), Politician

References

Villages in Elbląg County